Shara Lin Yi-hsin (born 5 November 1985) is a Taiwanese musician, actress, singer, and television host. She plays mainly violin and piano, but also guzheng and guitar; she is polyglot (Chinese, English, Taiwanese, Filipino, Korean and Japanese).

Career 
At age of six, Lin played in her first movie. As a violinist, she won at age 12 a first place award in an international competition in Japan. Later, she made her first starring role in the film .

Filmography

Films 
 Summer Times (2009)
 Monga (2011)
 I Love You So Much (2012)
 Piano Trojan (2013)
 A Good Wife 親愛的，我愛上別人了(2013)
 Peace in Love (2014)
 First Kiss (2014)

Television series

References

External links

 
 

21st-century Taiwanese actresses
Taiwanese film actresses
Taiwanese classical pianists
Taiwanese composers
Taiwanese violinists
Musicians from Tainan
1985 births
Living people
21st-century Taiwanese singers
21st-century Taiwanese women singers
21st-century classical pianists
21st-century violinists
Actresses from Tainan
21st-century women pianists